In computing, a locale is a set of parameters that defines the user's language, region and any special variant preferences that the user wants to see in their user interface. Usually a locale identifier consists of at least a language code and a country/region code.
Locale is an important aspect of i18n.

General locale settings 

These settings usually include the following display (output) format settings:

 Number format setting
 Character classification, case conversion settings
 Date-time format setting
 String collation setting
 Currency format setting
 Paper size setting
 Color setting

The locale settings are about formatting output given a locale. So, the time zone information and daylight saving time are not usually part of the locale settings.
Less usual is the input format setting, which is mostly defined on a per application basis.

Programming and markup language support 
In these environments,

 C
 C++
 Eiffel
 Java
 .NET Framework
 REBOL
 Ruby
 Perl
 PHP
 Python
 XML
 JSP
 JavaScript

and other (nowadays) Unicode-based environments, they are defined in a format similar to BCP 47. They are usually defined with just ISO 639 (language) and ISO 3166-1 alpha-2 (2-letter country) codes.

POSIX platforms 

On POSIX platforms such as Unix, Linux and others, locale identifiers are defined by ISO/IEC 15897, which is similar to the BCP 47 definition of language tags, but the locale variant modifier is defined differently, and the character set is included as a part of the identifier. It is defined in this format: .

In the next example there is an output of command locale for Czech language (cs), Czech Republic (CZ) with explicit UTF-8 encoding:

 $ locale
 LANG=cs_CZ.UTF-8
 LC_CTYPE="cs_CZ.UTF-8"
 LC_NUMERIC="cs_CZ.UTF-8"
 LC_TIME="cs_CZ.UTF-8"
 LC_COLLATE="cs_CZ.UTF-8"
 LC_MONETARY="cs_CZ.UTF-8"
 LC_MESSAGES="cs_CZ.UTF-8"
 LC_PAPER="cs_CZ.UTF-8"
 LC_NAME="cs_CZ.UTF-8"
 LC_ADDRESS="cs_CZ.UTF-8"
 LC_TELEPHONE="cs_CZ.UTF-8"
 LC_MEASUREMENT="cs_CZ.UTF-8"
 LC_IDENTIFICATION="cs_CZ.UTF-8"
 LC_ALL=

Specifics for Microsoft platforms 

Windows uses specific language and territory strings.
The locale identifier (LCID) for unmanaged code on Microsoft Windows is a number such as 1033 for English (United States) or 1041 for Japanese (Japan). These numbers consist of a language code (lower 10 bits) and a culture code (upper bits), and are therefore often written in hexadecimal notation, such as 0x0409 or 0x0411.
Microsoft is starting to introduce managed code application programming interfaces (APIs) for .NET that use this format. One of the first to be generally released is a function to mitigate issues with internationalized domain names, but more are in Windows Vista Beta 1.

Starting with Windows Vista, new functions that use BCP 47 locale names have been introduced to replace nearly all LCID-based APIs.

See also
 Internationalization and localization
 ISO 639 language codes
 ISO 3166-1 alpha-2 region codes
 ISO 15924 script codes
 IETF language tag
 C localization functions
 CCSID
 Code page
 Common Locale Data Repository
 Date and time representation by country
 AppLocale

References

External links 

 BCP 47
 Language Subtag Registry
 Common Locale Data Repository
  Javadoc API documentation
 Locale and Language information from Microsoft
 MS-LCID: Windows Language Code Identifier (LCID) Reference from Microsoft
 Microsoft LCID list
 Microsoft LCID chart with decimal equivalents
 POSIX Environment Variables
 Low Level Technical details on defining a POSIX locale
 ICU Locale Explorer
 Debian Wiki on Locales
 Article "The Standard C++ Locale" by Nathan C. Myers
 locale(7): Description of multi-language support - Linux man page
 Apache C++ Standard Library Locale User's Guide
 Sort order charts for various operating system locales and database collations
 NATSPEC Library
 Description of locale-related UNIX environment variables in Debian Linux Reference Manual
 Guides to locales and locale creation on various platforms

Unix user management and support-related utilities
Unix SUS2008 utilities
Internationalization and localization